Hersant is a surname. Notable people with the surname include:

Guy Hersant (born 1949), French photographer
Philippe Hersant (born 1948), French composer
Philippe Hersant (newspaper publisher) (born 1957), French newspaper publisher
Robert Hersant (1920–1996), French newspaper publisher